Running in the Family is an album by Level 42.

Running in the Family may also refer to:
"Running in the Family" (song), a song by Level 42
Running in the Family (memoir), a fictionalized memoir by Michael Ondaatje